Qutb ud-Daula (died 1821) was Nawab of Masulipatam from 1799. His power was mostly nominal from 1800. As titular Nawab, he continued until his death.

He was succeeded by his brother Nawab Muhammad Ali Khan Bahadur. He had a daughter named Manna Begum.

Titles held

See also
Nawab of Carnatic
Nawab of Banganapalle

Notes

Nawabs of India
1821 deaths
Year of birth unknown
Mughal Empire